Rock Valley School is a historic one-room school building located at Rock Valley in Delaware County, New York, United States. It was built in 1885 and is a one-story wood-frame building on a cut-stone foundation and gable roof.  The main section of the building is rectangular and approximately 24 feet by 36 feet, two bays wide and three bays deep.  It was used as a school into the early 1940s and used as a polling place and community meeting house since the 1950s.

It was listed on the National Register of Historic Places in 2008.

See also
National Register of Historic Places listings in Delaware County, New York

References

National Register of Historic Places in Delaware County, New York
Defunct schools in New York (state)
Schoolhouses in the United States
One-room schoolhouses in New York (state)
School buildings completed in 1885